Qidi (also called Qiedi 切弟) is a Southern Loloish language of Yunnan, China. Qidi is spoken in Jiangcheng Hani and Yi Autonomous County,  Mojiang Hani Autonomous County,  and Lüchun County.

In Mojiang County, Qiedi is spoken by a total of 1,497 people in Baliu Township 坝溜乡 (Yang & Zhang 2010:9).

Vocabulary
Hu & Dai (1964:80) cite the following forms for Qidi (七第). Gloss translations are from Wheatley (1982:13).
 'eat' (吃)
 'hit, beat' (打)
 'foam, soak' (泡沫)
 'live, exist' (活)

References

Yang Hong [杨洪], Zhang Hong [张红]. 2010. Demographics and current situations of Hani subgroups in Mojiang County [墨江哈尼族自治县哈尼支系与人口现状调查研究]. Journal of Honghe University [红河学院学报]. Vol. 8, No. 3. Jun. 2010. 
You Weiqiong [尤伟琼]. 2013. Classifying ethnic groups of Yunnan [云南民族识别研究]. Beijing: Nationalities Press [民族出版社].

Southern Loloish languages
Languages of Yunnan